Aberrant is a role-playing game created by White Wolf Game Studio in 1999, set in 2008 in a world where super-powered humans started appearing one day in 1998. It is the middle setting in the greater Trinity Universe timeline, chronologically situated about 90 years after Adventure!, White Wolf's Pulp era game, and over a century before the psionic escapades of Trinity/Aeon. The game deals with how the players' meta-human characters (called "novas") fit into a mundane world when they most definitely are not mundane, as well as how the mundane populace react to the sudden emergence of novas. The original Aberrant product line was discontinued in 2002, though a d20 System version was released in 2004. Onyx Path Publishing has recently acquired the rights to the Trinity Universe and released a new edition of the game, titled Trinity Continuum: Aberrant, in 2021.

Setting
Aberrant is the middle game of the Trinity Universe, and is thus the prequel to Trinity and the sequel to Adventure!. Trinity details the future history of the novas, over a 60-year span of time, while Adventure! covers the dawn of this setting in the 1920s.

Aberrant is unique among the publisher's game-lines for having no particular castes or character classes. Aside from this, it shares with many other White Wolf games a tendency to embrace "shades of gray" morality and reject the traditional superhero trope of "heroes vs. villains".

The second edition, Trinity Continuum: Aberrant, presents a few significant changes to the setting. The events of "N-Day" in which the first novas began to appear were set 10 years later in Trinity Continuum: Aberrant than they were in the previous edition. Elements of malignant conspiracy within the organizations of the Aeon Society and their nova-facing Project Utopia and Project Proteus were reduced or removed with the new edition, and guidelines for facilitating play across multiple subgeneres of superhero media were introduced.

Powers
Super powers in Aberrant come from an individual's ability to manipulate energy at the "quantum" sub-atomic level. Since individuals who can do this have an imperfect understanding of quantum mechanics, their powers are limited by their subconscious and usually follow a specific "path" or are linked to a specific focus. For instance, all the powers of the nova called Anteus revolve around nature; he can teleport by stepping into a tree and out of another tree of the same type somewhere else, create new species of animals, or alter the normal course of life and death for plants and animals. All of his powers follow his focus of nature. Other novas have other foci such as plasma, fire, water, shapechanging, or invulnerability.

Taint
As a nova's ability to touch the quantum fabric of the world grows, he begins to experience Taint, the side effects of channeling larger amounts of energy. Taint is the 'non-humanness' side of quantum manipulation and at higher levels novas begin to show either physical or mental defects. These defects vary widely; examples might include a tentacle growing from one's stomach, sociopathic disorders, hair made of flames, odd skin composition (such as rubber), a power that is "always on", megalomania, or continual radiation.

In Trinity Continuum: Aberrant, Taint is no longer present. This mechanic is replaced with Transcendence, which provides a measure of how far the nova has deviated from humanity. As a nova acquires Quantum and Flux, their Transcendence increases. This leads to Transformations, which alter the nova's appearance, powers, or even their mental state.

Factions
The metaplot revolves around the interactions between various factions, most of which employ Nova agents. Among the most important are:

Project Utopia, an organisation with seemingly altruistic ideals that promotes cooperation between Novas and humans to build a more perfect world. Utopia has UN sanction to deal with novas. It is also linked to the Aeon Trinity organisation, which rises to greater prominence in Trinity and whose roots are detailed in Adventure!.
Project Proteus, which is a group that takes care of the "dirty work" of keeping Novas in line. Storytellers are encouraged to determine themselves how far that might go; it can be taken from the light extreme of ordering the assassinations of Novas that have become too powerful and now are a true threat to the planet, or to the extreme of creating a global conspiracy to sterilize Novas as they erupt and manufacturing wars to kill them.
The Teragen (Greek > "Monster / Marvel race"), a diverse group of Novas who share a common philosophy called Teras (Greek > "Monster"). A direct result of this philosophy is that the group willingly embraces its evolved status, and therefore claim biological superiority to humans. While the outside world view the Teragen as a single group, it is actually a coalition of different interests united by philosophy and their enigmatic inspiration, Divis Mal. In his Null Manifesto, he declared, essentially, that novas could only be governed by their peers, freeing its members from the obligations of human law.
The Aberrants, a group of Novas concerned about evidence of corruption within Project Utopia. While a small faction, they are nevertheless taken very seriously by Project Utopia.
The Directive, an intelligence organisation controlled by the governments of Russia, the United Kingdom, Germany, Japan and the United States.

Various smaller groups exist, most of which are focused on more specific goals. Players' characters generally belong to one of the above factions, work for a specific corporation, or hire themselves out for odd jobs, often as mercenaries or troubleshooters.

System
Aberrant uses a modified version of the Storyteller System. A character adds his attribute to his skill (or power as the case may be) and rolls that many 10-sided dice. Any die that comes up as a 7 or higher counts as 1 success. Accomplishing different tasks requires different numbers of successes to accomplish. Flying a plane may only require 1 success, but flying a 747 with a near fatal wound, all the rest of the crew dead, and no hydraulic pressure could require 5 or more successes.

The first major difference with Aberrant is that in addition to normal attributes such as Dexterity, Manipulation and Wits, novas have what are called Mega-Attributes. Scores in such attributes may be added as dice every time a character makes a roll using the linked mundane attribute, but Mega-Attributes are much more powerful. Every success rolled using Mega-Attribute dice counts as 2 normal successes, and rolling a 10 counts as 3 successes. Alternatively, the scores in a Mega-Attribute may be used to reduce the difficulty on a one for one basis, though never below needing one success. The player can choose each turn which way to use his Mega-Attribute, and can even split the points between the two ways.

Powers are treated almost exactly like skills except that they come in different levels of power. Level 1 powers are comparatively weak, while level 6 powers can do nearly anything (one level 6 power is 'Universe Creation'). Lower level powers are cheaper to purchase with experience, while higher level powers cost more. There are a wide range of powers from controlling any single element (fire, gravity, entropy, quantum, magnetism, etc.), to flying, to mental domination, to imperviousness, to time travel, and teleportation.

Books
Several books outlined by Kraig Blackwelder, Aberrant's developer, were in the works for Aberrant at the time of its cancellation, most notably the three "Mega-Books," each of which focused on what it might be like to have Mega-Social, Mega-Mental, or Mega-Physical Attributes, while also shedding light on some other element of the Aberrant setting. The first of these Mega-Books, called Aberrant: Cult of Personality, took a close look at Social Mega-Attributes and also examined the rise of nova-led cults. This book was complete and waiting for art at the time of the game's cancellation. The second of the Mega-Books, called Aberrant: Brainwaves, was going to examine Mental Mega-Attributes and provide comprehensive rules for "gadgeteers," those novas who use their vast minds to build amazing devices. The last of the Mega-Books, tentatively titled Aberrant: Brute Force, would address the standard Physical Mega-Attributes while also providing players with background and rules for civic defenders, novas employed by cities to act as crime fighters/public relations operatives.

Aberrant Core rulebook (two editions, limited and unlimited)
Aberrant Storyteller's screen and companion (Gamemaster's screen with adventure & background sourcebook)
Aberrant Worldwide: Phase I (adventure book)
Aberrant Worldwide: Phase II (adventure book)
Aberrant Players' Guide (background and rules expansion)
Aberrant: Year One (setting book)
Project Utopia
Teragen
The Directive
Elites
Underworld (solely available in electronic form)
Brainwaves (unpublished manuscript released by author Steve Kenson, solely available in electronic form)
Exposé: Aberrants (mini sourcebook)
XWF (mini sourcebook)
Fear and Loathing (mini sourcebook)
ReignofEvil.com (mini sourcebook)
Church of Michael Archangel (mini sourcebook)

Fan-written Supplements
Forceful Personalities (book by EON, solely in electronic form)
The New Flesh (book by EON, solely in electronic form)
A Breed Apart (mini sourcebook by EON, solely in electronic form)
Aberrant Nexus (book by EON, solely in electronic form)

References

External links
Onyx Path Official site

White Wolf Publishing games
Science fiction role-playing games
Superhero role-playing games
Human-derived fictional species
Role-playing games introduced in 1999
Contemporary role-playing games
Alternate history role-playing games